Shrift may refer to:

 Confession
 Absolution
 Shrift (band), a band with vocalist Nina Miranda